Akawe Torkula Polytechnic (ATP) is a polytechnic in Makurdi, Benue State, Central Nigeria. It came into being when Akawe Torkula College of Advanced and Professional Studies, ATCAPS, was upgraded to a polytechnic by the Benue State Executive Council in January 2020.

In June 2021, the Benue State Government recruited both teaching and non-teaching staff for the institution.

References

Educational institutions in Nigeria
Academic libraries in Nigeria